Víkingur Ólafsson (born 14 February 1984) is an Icelandic pianist.

He has performed with leading orchestras in Europe and America, including the Los Angeles Philharmonic, Philharmonia Orchestra, Minnesota Orchestra, Gothenburg Symphony Orchestra, Detroit Symphony Orchestra, and the Swedish Radio Symphony Orchestra, and with such conductors as Thomas Adès, Esa-Pekka Salonen, and Santtu-Matias Rouvali. He has won numerous awards, including Album of the Year at the 2019 BBC Music Magazine Awards for Johann Sebastian Bach.

Víkingur's album Philip Glass Piano Works saw him named "Iceland's Glenn Gould" by the New York Times, and a "breathtakingly brilliant pianist" by Gramophone; Le Monde heralded his "volcanic temperament, great virtuosity, taste for challenges".

Early life and education
Víkingur Ólafsson grew up in Reykjavík and started playing the piano at an early age under the tutelage of his mother, a piano teacher. He studied at the Juilliard School in New York, earning bachelor's and master's degrees under the supervision of Jerome Lowenthal and Robert McDonald. He also took lessons with Ann Schein.

Career
In 2011, Víkingur was the soloist in the opening concert of Harpa in Reykjavík, playing Edvard Grieg's piano concerto with the Iceland Symphony Orchestra under the baton of Vladimir Ashkenazy.

In the 2019–20 season, Víkingur gave the French première of John Adams's Must the Devil Have All the Good Tunes? with the Orchestre Philharmonique de Radio France and performed it with the Netherlands Radio Philharmonic Orchestra, both with Adams conducting.

In the same season, Víkingur was artist-in-residence at the Konzerthaus Berlin, with fourteen performances over eleven different projects, playing concertos by Adès, Robert Schumann, Daníel Bjarnason, and Mozart, two solo recitals, and chamber programmes with Martin Fröst and Florian Boesch. He has an exclusive recording contract with Deutsche Grammophon.

Víkingur has premiered six piano concertos by Icelandic composers—including , Daníel Bjarnason, Haukur Tómasson, and —as well as solo and chamber works by Atli Ingólfsson, Mark Simpson, and Mark-Anthony Turnage. He has taken part in collaborative performances with Philip Glass (in Reykjavík, Gothenburg, and London) and Björk, the latter on the television programme Átta raddir, produced by Jónas Sen for RÚV, the Icelandic National Broadcasting Service.

Recordings
Víkingur has released three albums on his own record label, Dirrindí:
 2009 – Debut, featuring Brahms's 7 Fantasies Op. 116 and 16 Waltzes as well as Beethoven's Eroica Variations.
 2011 – Chopin-Bach, featuring Chopin's preludes and two of Bach's partitas.
 2012 – Winterreise, featuring Schubert's Winterreise with Icelandic operatic bass singer Kristinn Sigmundsson (CD and DVD), which won Classical Album of the Year at the 2012 Icelandic Music Awards

In 2016, Víkingur signed an exclusive recording contract with Deutsche Grammophon.
 2017 – Philip Glass – Piano Works, featuring Philip Glass's Études, "Opening" from Glassworks, and a rework of Glassworks by Christian Badzura
 2018 – Johann Sebastian Bach, featuring Bach's works for keyboard solo. The album won multiple awards, including BBC Music Magazine's Album of the Year
 2020 – Debussy • Rameau
 2021 – Reflections featuring Hania Rani, Balmorhea, and Hugar and Helgi Jonsson
 2021 – Mozart & Contemporaries
 2022 – From Afar

Víkingur also recorded the soundtrack of Darkest Hour, a film directed by Joe Wright, and released Bach Reworks, featuring six 'remixed' works by J. S. Bach from the likes of Ben Frost, Peter Gregson, Valgeir Sigurðsson, as well as Víkingur himself.

Awards
 2019 – Gramophone magazine Artist of the Year
 2019 – BBC Music Magazine Recording of the Year for Johann Sebastian Bach
 2019 – BBC Music Magazine Instrumental Album of the Year for Johann Sebastian Bach
 2019 – Opus Klassik Piano Recital Album of the Year for Johann Sebastian Bach
 2019 – Limelight Magazine International Artist of the Year
 2022 – Rolf Schock Prize in the Music category
 2023 – CoScan Nordic Person of the Year

Broadcasting
Víkingur has hosted two television series about classical music. Broadcast on RÚV, they were well received by critics. He has also written and hosted radio programmes for Rás 1 and BBC Radio 3.

Festivals
In 2012, Víkingur founded Reykjavík Midsummer Music, an annual chamber music festival held in Harpa, Reykjavík. The festival won Musical Event of the Year at the 2012 Icelandic Music Awards, along with a special prize for innovation. In 2015, the pianist succeeded Martin Fröst as the artistic director of Sweden's Vinterfest.

At the 2014 Transart Festival in Bolzano, Italy, Víkingur collaborated with Swiss artist Roman Signer in an event titled Vers la Flamme – Ein Konzert mit Störung. Víkingur performed Alexander Scriabin's Vers la flamme on a floating stage on Lake Vernago with a helicopter hovering over him.

Personal life
Víkingur has both absolute pitch and synesthesia, whereby he associates keys with colors. For example, he reportedly associates F minor with blue, A major with yellow, and B major with purple.

References

External links
 

Vikingur Olafsson
Vikingur Olafsson
Living people
1984 births
Deutsche Grammophon artists
21st-century pianists
Juilliard School alumni
21st-century classical pianists
Icelandic classical musicians
21st-century Icelandic people